A number of heads of state and heads of government have died by suicide, either while in office or after leaving office. National leaders who die by suicide while in office generally do so because their leadership is somehow threatened – for instance, by a coup or an invading army.

Heads of state

Heads of government

References 

Lists of heads of government
Politicians who committed suicide
Heads of government